Hawanatu Bangura (born 2 January 1988) is a sprinter from Sierra Leone. She is listed at 4'8 tall and 115 lbs. Bangura represented her country at the 2004 Summer Olympics in the 100m dash in Athens, Greece. In Athens she finished 7th in her individual heat with a time of 12.11, .97 of a second off heat winner Vida Anim of Ghana.

References
 Profile of Bangura at Yahoo! Sports

1988 births
Living people
Sportspeople from Freetown
Athletes (track and field) at the 2004 Summer Olympics
Olympic athletes of Sierra Leone
Sierra Leonean female sprinters
Olympic female sprinters